The Democratic Renovation (Rénovation Démocratique) is a political party in Mauritania. The party won 2 out of 95 seats in the 19 November and 3 December 2006 elections.

Political parties in Mauritania